Charles Thomas Martin (born January 8, 1968) is an American football coach and former player. He is currently the head coach at Miami University and was previously the offensive coordinator at the University of Notre Dame. Martin was the head coach at Grand Valley State University from 2004 to 2009, compiling a record of 74–7. His Grand Valley State Lakers won consecutive NCAA Division II Football Championships in 2005 and 2006 and were runners-up in 2009.

Early life and education
Born and raised in Park Forest, Illinois in an Irish Catholic family, Martin graduated from Rich East High School in 1986. Martin attended Millikin University, an NCAA Division III school, and played both football and basketball. On the football team, Martin earned All-American honors as a safety and all-conference honors as a placekicker. Martin played at guard on the Millikin basketball team and averaged 9.6 points, 6.2 rebounds, and 4.2 assists as a senior.

Coaching career
From 2005 to 2009, Martin's Lakers football team only lost one regular season game (Hillsdale College, 2009), and only lost two post-season games at the end of the 2007 and 2008 seasons, setting a record for consecutive wins, 48, breaking the previous mark of 29 games also set by the Lakers spanning from 2000 to 2003 by then head coach, Brian Kelly.

From 2005 to 2007, the Lakers under Martin set an all-time NCAA Division II record with 40 consecutive wins, breaking a half-century old mark set by in-state and in-conference rival Hillsdale College.

Martin was the offensive coordinator at Notre Dame for the 2012 season, where the Fighting Irish finished the regular season with a 12–0 record and a berth in the BCS National Championship Game.

On December 3, 2013, it was announced that Martin would be leaving his position at Notre Dame to take over as the head coach at Miami University for the 2014 season.

Head coaching record

References

External links
 Miami profile

1968 births
Living people
American football placekickers
American football safeties
American men's basketball players
Guards (basketball)
Eastern Michigan Eagles football coaches
Grand Valley State Lakers football coaches
Minnesota State Mavericks football coaches
Millikin Big Blue football players
Millikin Big Blue men's basketball players
Notre Dame Fighting Irish football coaches
Wittenberg Tigers football coaches
People from Park Forest, Illinois
Players of American football from Illinois
Sportspeople from Cook County, Illinois
Basketball players from Illinois
American people of Irish descent